Farover is the tenth album by Grammy Award–winning Jamaican roots reggae singer and musician Winston Rodney under the name of Burning Spear.

Track listing
All tracks are composed by Winston Rodney

"Farover" – 4:22 
"Greetings" – 4:42 
"Image (Of Marcus Mosiah Garvey)" – 4:53
"Rock" – 3:32 
"Education" – 4:12
"She's Mine" – 4:48
"Message" – 5:26 
"Oh Jah" – 5:33
"Jah Is My Driver" – 4:47

Credits
Recorded and mixed at Tuff Gong Recording Studio, Kingston, Jamaica
Engineer Errol Brown
Mixed by Winston Rodney and Errol Brown
Original cover by Neville Garrick

Personnel 
Winston Rodney – lead vocals, background vocals, percussion
Anthony Bradshaw – bass, percussion, background vocals (track 7)
Aston "Family Man" Barrett – organ, clavinet, bass (track 9)
Nelson Miller – drums, octoban
Michael Wilson – lead and rhythm guitar
Devon Bradshaw – rhythm guitar, lead guitar track 7
Richard Johnson – organ, piano, synthesizer, clavinet
Herman Marquis – alto saxophone
Bobby Ellis – trumpet, percussion
Elias Rodney – percussion

Burning Spear albums
1982 albums
EMI Records albums